Dawn, Twilight and Midnight or Dawn, Evening, and Midnight is a Russian fairy tale collected by Russian folklorist Alexander Afanasyev and published in his compilation Russian Fairy Tales as number 140. The tale was translated by Jeremiah Curtin and published in Fairy Tales of Eastern Europe.

It is classified in the Aarne-Thompson-Uther Index as tale type ATU 301, "The Three Stolen Princesses". This type refers to a set of stories where three heroes (or three brothers) approach a cave or hollow and send one of them down to rescue three captured princesses.

Summary
A king, Gosudar, builds an underground palace to house his daughters from any danger. Yet, they insist they leave the palace for a stroll in the garden, to see "the white world". When they do so, a strong whirlwind blows and takes them away.

The king, then, sends his men all over the kingdom, to find heroes brave enough to rescue the three princesses. An old widow's three sons decide to try their luck and heed the king's proclamation. They were called Midnight, Twilight and Dawn, named so after the time of the day when they were born.

The three siblings go their way and arrive in an abandoned hut in the forest at the edge of a desert. They soon alternate their tasks: while two hunt, the other stays at home to cook something. For three days, a man, small in stature, but strong in power, defeats the older brothers, Midnight and Twilight, but Dawn defeats the creature, who escapes to a crevasse on the mountain.

Dawn fashions a strong rope from the bark of trees and descends the hole, arriving at three palaces, of copper, silver and gold. Inside each palace, one of the kidnapped princesses and a many-headed serpent that guards her.

Dawn kills each of the evil serpents, rescues the princesses and lifts them through the rope to the upper world.

Analysis

Tale type 
The story belongs to a Märchen cycle of a youth that rescues three princesses from their captivity in a subterranean realm and is betrayed by his companions.

The tale is related to tale type AT 301B, Jean de l'Ours, wherein a strong man, born of a union between a bear and a human woman, meets two equally strong companions and departs to rescue three maidens, imprisoned in an underground realm.

It has also been suggested that tale types ATU 301 and Jean de l'Ours, ATU 650 ("Strong Hans"), ATU 302 ("Devil's Heart in the Egg") and ATU 554 ("The Grateful Animals") may have once comprised a single narrative, but, with time, the original story fragmented into different tale types.

Motifs

The birth of the heroes 
Professor Jack V. Haney stated that the motif of triplets being born at different times of one single day occurs in East Slavic tradition. In addition, Bashkir scholarship concurs that the motif of the heroes' birth at different times of the day happens in East Slavic tales, as well as among other peoples of the (then) Soviet Union.

The castles in the eggs or apples 
A recurrent motif of the tale type is the transformation of the underworld castles of the princesses into a more portable form (usually eggs, apples or balls). Thus, the eggs serve as protective shells for the castles - one of many magical properties attached to eggs, as folklorist Venetia Newall observed. Russian philologist Vladimir Toporov noticed the occurrence of the "egg-kingdom" in Russian fairy tales and saw an approximation of the motif with the Estonian and Balto-Finnic cosmogonic myth about the "cosmic egg".

Jeremiah Curtin saw a parallel between the Russian tale and a similar motif in the Hungarian folktale Prince Mirko or Mirko, the King's Son, wherein Prince Mirko and a rescued princess shrink a diamond castle into a golden apple.

Translations
Journalist and children's book author Arthur Ransome published an extended and more detailed version of the story, with the name The Three Men of Power - Evening, Midnight and Sunrise. He described Evening as "dusky, with brown eyes and hair" and riding a horse of a dusky brown color; Midnight as "dark, with eyes and hair as black as charcoal" and riding a black horse; and Sunrise with "hair golden as the sun, and eyes blue as morning sky", and riding a horse "as white as the clouds".

Professor Jack V. Haney translated the tale as "Dawn, Evening and Midnight". Another translation is Evening, Midnight and Dawn.

Variants

Distribution
The tale type ATU 301 is, according to Jack Haney, "one of the most popular in the East Slavic tradition", as well as being "widely reported" across Europe.

Russia

Russian variants of the tale fall under the banner The Realms of Copper, Silver and Gold. In fact, this tale type, also known as Three Kingdoms - Copper, Silver and Golden, is one of "the most popular Russian folktales".

Variants of the tale type are also attested with Selkup storytellers. These variants show the presence of character Koschei, the Deathless, the sorcerer of Slavic folklore, and are also classified as type ATU 302, "Devil's (Ogre's) Heart in the Egg" or ATU 313, "The Magic Flight".

Regional tales

Professor Jack V. Haney also translated another tale from raconteur Matvei Mikhailovich Korguev (1883-1943). In his tale, called Dawn Lad, three brothers are born at different times of the day: Evening Lad at night, Midnight Lad at midnight and Dawn Lad at dawn. Equal in strength, they walk toward a mountain range to find out who lives there: they find three maidens (a merchant's daughter, a king's daughter and a tsarevna) captive under three many-headed serpents. Each brother kills one of the serpents. Later, Dawn Lad and his brothers liberate another princess from evil wizard Chernomor. When they descend the mountain range through an anchor, Dawn Lad's brothers take back the anchor and leave their sibling stranded. With the help of the fourth princess. Dawn Lad returns to the tsarevna and marries her, but the narrative does not mention a reckoning on his brothers' abandonment.

Russian folklorist Ivan Khudyakov (ru) collected a variant titled "Иван Вечерней Зори" ("Ivan Star-of-Evening"), wherein a merchant has three sons that grow up in hours: Иван Вечерней Зори ("Ivan Star-of-the-Evening"), Иван Полуночной Зори ("Ivan Star-of-Midnight") and Иван Утренней Зори ("Ivan Star-of-the-Morning"). They live in a kingdom. In this realm, the king's three daughters have been captured by a six-headed serpent and their father requests any soul brave enough to rescue them. Ivan Star-of-Evening and his brothers offer themselves to the mission. They find a bogatyr named Bely on the journey and the four join forces to rescue the princesses. They soon reach a mountain and Ivan Star-of-Evening shoots an arrow with a rope to create a bridge to reach the mountains dangerous slopes. Ivan Star-of-Evening climbs the rope with his horse, arrives at three palaces (of copper, silver, and gold), kills three serpents (with six, nine and twelve heads) and takes the princesses to his companions. Bely betrays them and abandons Ivan-Star-of-the-Evening in the mountain. Fortunately, the hero finds a winged steed and returns to the realm to expose Bely's betrayal on his wedding day.

In the tale "О трех богатырях - Вечернике, Полуношнике и Световике" ("About three heroic bogatyrs - The-One-of-the-Evening, The-One-of-Midnight and The-One-of-the-Sunrise"), first collected in Siberia from storyteller Anton Ignatievich Koshkarov (Anton Chiroshnik) in 1925, Tsar Eruslan wishes to have a son. A hermit advises the king to find a golden fish and give to his wife. She becomes pregnant and gives birth to three boys: one in the evening, one at midnight and the last at sunrise. As soon as they are born, they leave home, but return three days later after a stay in the woods. After a series of adventures, the youngest brother, Svetovike ("The-One-of-Sunrise") rescues three princesses and marries the youngest.

In another Siberian tale, "Иван Вечерник, Иван Полуношник и Иван Зорькин" ("Ivan of Evening, Ivan of Midnight and Ivan of Dawn"), first collected in 1926 from raconteur I. Ivanov, the tsar's three daughters convince their father to go on a boat trip under the moonlight, but they are kidnapped. An old woman's three sons, the titular heroes, decide to rescue them. On their way, they meet a fourth companion, a devil-like being. They arrive at a mountain where the princesses are being kept and Ivan Zorikin casts a rope to climb the mountain.

In a third Siberian tale, "Вечерник, Заутренник и Светлан" ("Evening, Sunrise and Day"), first collected in 1926 from twelve-year-old Vasya Solovyov, an old woman loses her husband in the war. Some time later, she eats three fruits and gives birth to three boys: one at night, the second at sunrise and the third during the day. Svetlan, the youngest, finds a horse. The trio arrive at the edge of a hole and Svetlan climbs down a rope. He rescues the tsar's three daughters, but his brothers cut the rope and he gets left behind in the underground. Svetlan finds an old lady, who summons all her birds and the Firebird to help him reach the surface. When Svetlan arrives in the surface, he rides a horse to the wedding of his brothers and wants to kill them, but his mother begs for Svetlan to forgive his brothers. He does, but insists they should be thrown in prison.

Belarus
In a Belarusian variant, "Иван-утренник" or "Иван Утреник" ("Ivan Utrennik", or "Ivan of the Morning"), three sons are born to an elderly couple: Иван Вечерник ("Ivan Vechernik" or "Ivan-of-Evening"), born at night; Иван Полуночник ("Ivan Polunochik" or "Ivan-of-Midnight"), born at midnight, and Иван Утреник, born in the morning. Ivan-of-Evening is angry, Ivan-of-Midnight angry and Ivan-of-Morning the most heroic. They decide to rescue the tsar's three daughters. They go to the woods and find a place to spend the night. When they take turns to cook the food the other hunted, a little old man with a logn grey beard appears and beats the hero to steal their food. When it is Ivan Utrennik's turn, he defeats the old man and sticks his grey beard to a trunk. Ivan Utrennik returns to his brothers to show them the captured thief, but he has escaped to a deep hole. The trio decides to follow after him and send Ivan Utrennik down the hole. He discovers the three captured princesses, each in a castle (one of copper, the other of silver and the third of gold). The princesses reveal their captor is "evil Kaschei". Ivan Utrennik decides to find "Kashei"'s death. On his way, he spares the lives of a kite, a wolf and a crayfish, who promise to help him. The three animals find the box with the villain's "death" (inside an egg). Ivan returns to the golden palace and sees the little grey-bearded man; he then smashes the egg on his forehead and kills him. Ivan Utrennik takes the princesses to his brothers to pull them up to the surface, but as soon as the maidens are saved, they cut the rope and abandon their youngest brother in the hole. He then wanders through the underworld until he finds an oak tree. He hears bird screeches coming from a nest on the treetop and protect the little birds from a hailstorm. Their father, a "Nagai bird", tells him he needs huge amounts of meat for the trip back to the surface. Ivan Utrennik reaches the surface, employs himself as a weaver and a shoemaker to provide marriage gifts for the youngest princess (the one from the palace of gold). When he is brought to the king's presence, the princess recognizes him and they marry.

In another variant from Belarus, "Вячорка, Паўношнік і Заравы" ("Vyachorka, Pavnoshnik and Zaravy"; "Evening, Midnight and Dawn"), an elderly couple has three sons at three times of the day, all named Ivan: Ivan Vyachorka ("Ivan Evening"), Ivan Pawnoshnik ("Ivan Midnight") and Ivan Zaravy ("Ivan Dawn"). They decide to rescue the tsar's three daughters. They find in the woods a hut on chicken legs and decide to spend the night. One night, a little bearded man comes to steal their food, but Ivan Zaravy beats him up. The little bearded man begs for mercy and offers to be their "little brother". Soon, the four arrive at a hole and Ivan Zaravy descends it by a rope. He finds the first princess in a palace of copper, with her three-headed serpentine captor. Ivan Zaravy defeats it, transforms the palace into an egg by the use of a handkerchief and takes the princess to his brothers. He rescues the princess in the silver palace, takes her to his brothers, and finally the princess in the golden palace. As soon as the last maiden arrives at the surface, Ivan Zaravy's allies cut the chain and strand him in the underworld. The youth walks until he finds a great oak with a bird nest. He protects the bird nest with his cloak and the birds' grateful father, the Firebird, promises to take him to the surface. He arrives at the surface when the youngest princess is set to be married to her false savior.

Komi people
In a tale from the Komi people, "Рытко, Ойко да Асывко", collected by Komi Permian author Vasily Vasilyevich Klimov (ru), a old woman hosts a traveller in her house, and he prepares her a drink with a potion. Some time later, she gives birth to three sons, each one born at a time of the day. The three brothers find the princesses in the underworld and rescue them, but Asyvko is left there by the false hero Керöспыкöта. Asyvko returns to the surface and provides the princesses with their underworld palaces.

Finland
In a Finnish tale translated as Alkonyat, Éjfél és Virradat ("Twilight, Midnight and Daybreak"), a king's sevant has tree sons, born at different times of the day: Twligght, born at sunset; Midnight, born in the middle of the night, and Daybreak, born at dawn. One day, the king's three daughter, who lived all their lives sheltered in the palace, want to stroll outside the castle. Each of them stroll in the garden and are taken by a whirlwind. The king offers his daughters as rewars for the brothers in case they save them. Twilight, Midnight and Daybreak go on their quest and find a companion on the road. They later reach the foot of a mountain and throw a long iron chain to climb it. Daybreak climbs the chain and finds three houses, one of iron, another of copper and a third of silver, each of princesses inside, guarded by a many-headed dragon. Daybreak defeats the dragons and releases the princesses, and later kills the mother of the dragons in her underground lair. Daybreak guides the princesses to the iron chain. After the girls climb down the chain, their companion cuts off the links and strands Daybreak up in the mountain. He meets a blind man whom he cures and, in gratitude, gives him the means to climb down the mountain. Daybreak returns to the king's palace in time for the third princess's marriage to the traitorous companion. Daybreak kills the companion and marries the youngest princess.

Romania
In Romanian variants, the three heroes are born in the same day, at different times, which gives them their names: Serilă, Mezilă and Zorilă (or variations). In these tales, the youngest brother is named Dawn and appears to be the most heroic of the three brothers.

Regional tales
In a tale collected by Romanian folklorist  with the title Zorilă Mireanu, a poor woman gives birth to three brothers at different times of the day: the first named "De cu seară", born at night; "Miez de noapte", at midnight; and "Zorila" at dawn. In the same kingdom, the king's three daughters are kidnapped by three dragons and taken to an underground lair. Zorila and his brothers offer to rescue them.

Serbia
Serbian scholarship recalls a Serbian mythical story about three brothers, named Ноћило, Поноћило и Зорило ("Noćilo, Ponoćilo and Zorilo"), collected by Serbian writer Atanasije Nikolić. The brothers' mission was to rescue the king's daughters. Zorilo goes down the cave, rescues three princesses and with a whip changes their palaces into apples. When Zorilo is ready to go up, his brothers abandon him in the cave, but he escapes with the help of a bird. Serbian scholar Pavle Sofric (sr), in his book about Serbian folkmyths about trees, noted that the tree of the tale, an ash tree (Serbian: јасен), showed a great parallel to the Nordic tree as not to be coincidental.

Bulgaria 
A similar tale of three brothers born at different times of the day is attested in Bulgaria with the title  (English: "Dark, Midnight and Dawn").

Georgia
In a Georgian tale, ივანე ცისკარი (Ivan Tsisk’ris, Ivan Tsiskari, "Ivan of the Dawn" or The Tale of John Dawn), the wife of a blacksmith is given an apple by her husband. Nine months later, she gives birth to three boys: one in the afternoon, another at midnight and the third at dawn. Because of this, the first is named Ivane Mts’ukhrisa, the second Ivane Šuaɣamisa and the third Ivane Tsiskari.  Some time later, a local king witnesses his three daughters being kidnapped by a creature in a cloud (a devi) and taken from the kingdom. The three brothers decide to rescue the princesses and meet a companion on their way. They fashion a large chain to reach the mountains. Ivan Tsiskari enters three palaces (of copper, silver and gold), finds the maidens and three many-headed devis. He liberates the princesses, but is betrayed by the fourth companion and his brothers. The princess of the golden palace shouts at him to find a means of escape in the palace of the third devi.

Hungary
Elisabeth Rona-Sklárek commented that the tale about a youth who rescues three maidens from the underground prison was sehr verbreitetes ("very prevalent") in Hungary. 20th century Hungarian scholar, Ágnes Kovács found 145 variants of the tale type, divided into 6 redactions. Hungarian-American Linda Dégh locates 7 redactions of the tale type in Hungary: 5 she considers to be "distinctively Hungarian", 1 "ethnic Romanian" and another from the South Slavics.

One of the Hungarian redactions, classified as 301A II* by Kovács with the name Este, Éjfél, Hajnal ("Evening, Midnight and Dawn"), concerns three heroic brothers born on the same day, at different times. Nine variants of this type were found in Hungarian sources (as of the 1960s), and Akos Dömötor's updated version of the catalogue (published in 1988) registers 11 in total. These tales were still classified in the international index as AaTh 301A and, after 2004, as tale type ATU 301.

Regional tales
In the Hungarian tale Este, Éjfél mëg Hajnal or Abend, Mitternacht und Morgendämmerung ("Evening, Midnight and Daybreak"), a childless couple pray for a son. An old lady instructs the wife to eat however many beans she can find in her house. The woman finds three beans and eats them, giving birth to three boys: one at night, the second at midnight and the third at the break of dawn. The three brothers grow up very quickly and seek a job opportunity with the king, who sends them to rescue his three daughters. When the brothers camp out in the woods, a small creature defeats the two older brothers but is defeated by Daybreak. The usual story follows: Daybreak rescues the three princesses, is betrayed by his brothers, escapes to the upper world on the back of an eagle. At the end of the tale, he forgives his older brothers.

In the tale Hajnal, Vacsora és Éjféle ("Dawn, Night and Midnight"), collected by ethnographer  from Székely, an old woman gives birth to three boys, each named after the time of the day they were born. When they are of age, the king orders the youths to rescue his three daughters, otherwise they may lose their heads. The three brothers traverse a silver forest and a diamond forest until they reach a hole in the ground. The two brothers, with the help of a gypsy boy, begin to descend but feel afraid and climb back. Hajnal descends the rope and reaches three castles: the first guarded by an iron gate and two lions; the second by a stone walls and a pair of bears, and the third made entirely of marble and guarded by two elephants. After he is abandoned by his brothers and a gypsy boy, Hajnal has further adventures in the underworld and gains a three-legged horse. With the horse, he manages to reach the surface and the king's city.

In a variant by Gyorgy Gaal, Három Királyleány ("The Three Princesses"), the titular three princesses ask their father to stroll in the garden. When they are exposed, a dragon comes out of the water and takes them. Meanwhile, three brothers, Estve ("Night"), Éjfél ("Midnight") and Hajnal ("Dawn") comment with their mother the occurrence. Hajnal asks his mother to go to king and convince him to construct a large chain, which the youth intends to use to reach the princesses in their underground prison. Hajnal climbs down the chain and arrives at three palaces, one of copper, the second of silver and the third of gold, each housing one of the princesses and her serpentine captors. After Hajnal defeats the monsters, each princess transforms her respective palace into an apple, and follows Hajnal back to the surface.

In a variant collected by Árnold Ipolyi, Hajnalka ("Little Dawn"), a woman with no sons prays to God to have one. One night, she awakes and heats up the oven. A son is born at night: Este, who just as he appears, asks for some clothing to leave. His mother laments his departure. She awakes again at midnight, lights up a fire and another youth is born: Éjfél. He also leaves home. Finally, she awakes at dawn, lights the fire and a boy is born: Hajnalka. Just as they leave, they return the next day. Some time later, Hajnalka goes to the city and asks his mother why the kingdom seems to be grieving. His mother says it is because three dragons captured the princesses. Hajnalka states he and his brothers shall rescue them and orders the king for a grat chain to be built, so that he can use it to reach "másvilág" (The Other World), the realm of the dragons, located in an upper realm. Hajnalka climbs up th chain, rescues the three princesses on castles that gyrate on bird's feet (the copper castle on duck's, the silver palace on goose's and the golden one on crane's). With a magical wand, the youth transforms the palaces into small apples, gets the dragon's tongues, and depart with the princesses. On their way down, a "winged man" named Kalekaftor appears, takes the princesses (and the credit for their release) and abandons Hajnalka to his fate. Still in "másvilág", Hajnalka shields a nest of griffin chicks from "sulphur rain" and their grateful father takes him to the human world. Now on earth, Kalefaktor insists to be married to the youngest, who tries to delay the marriage by demanding the items she had in the golden castle in "másvilág". Hajnalka produces the items the princess asked for and marries her. The tale continues on as his brothers conspire to cut his legs and abandon him in the forest. Árnold Ipolyi noted that the usual location of the princesses' captivity is an underworld realm, even in a mountain, but not the sky.

Tatar people
In a tale from the Tatar people, published by folklorist  with the title "Тан-батыр" ("Dawn-Batyr"), the three daughters of a padishah are kidnapped by a sudden gust of wind. Near the edge of the village, an old couple have three sons, Kiç-Batyr ("Evening-Batyr"), born in the evening; Tön-Batyr ("Night-Batyr"), born at night, and Tan-Batyr, born in the morning. The trio decide to depart to rescue the three princesses. They start so a long journey their food they brought for the road is consumed. Tan-Batyr uses a needle his mother gave him in the fire and molds it into a fishing hook. He catches some fishes for himself and his brothers. Later, Tan-Batyr climbs a very tall tree to check their path, and a sudden gust of wind blows around them. Tan-Batyr supposes it is the same being that stole the three princesses. The wind materializes into a dev that Tan-Batyr fights and injures. The dev flees, leaving a trail of blood for the heroes to follow. They reach a cave entry blocked by a heavy stone. Tan-Batyr lifts the stone and descends the hole with a rope. With the help of a little mouse, the youth traverses through the thick darkness for seven days and seven nights, until he arrives at seven iron gates he crushes with his weapon. Behind them, three palaces, one of copper, the second of silver and the last of gold, each housing a captive princess inside. After rescuing the princesses, he becomes trapped in the lower world, but finds two animals, one black and one white, and jumps onto the black one, thus being led further into the underworld.

Bashkir people
Bashkir folklorist  published a tale from the Bashkir people also titled "Тан-батыр" ("Dawn-Batyr"). In this tale, a khan has no children. He meets a sorceress that advises him to divorce his wife. The khansha, his now divorced wife, goes to the river bank and cries over her fate, until a fish comes to her and gives her three fishes, telling her to eat the bodies and leave their heads to the cook. The khansha follows the fish's advice and gives birth to three daughters. A female cook also eats the dish, but hides her pregnancy. The khan is pleased with his wife and his daughters, and keeps them in the palace at all times. When they are seventeen years old, the princesses aks their father to see the world and prepare to sail on a boat, whan a sudden whirlwind descends and takes the princesses. The khan falls into a state of grief and orders the palace's servants to be killed. The female cook runs away from the palace and finds a hut, where she gives birth to her three sons: one born in the morning (Таном, "Tan"), the second in the afternoon (Тюшем, "Tyush") and the third at night (Кисом, "Kis"). The three grow up and become fine hunters. The trio learns from a blacksmith about the princesses' disappearance and ask the man to forge sword for them, for they will search for them. On their long quest, they meet the witch ubyr-ebi, who rolls a barrel and orders the brothers to follow it wherever it stops. The heroes follow her orders and reach a entrance on the ground. Tanom, the eldest, orders his brothers to lower him down the well in a cauldron. Down there, he walks until he finds a copper palace; inside, the princess warns him against the three-headed deva that will come through the copper bridge. He kills the deva and goes to a silver palace, where he fights a six-headed deva on a silver bridge. Lastly, he arrives at a golden palace and defeats a nine-headed deva on a golden bridge. Suddenly, the old witch appears and gives Tanom a copper grain, a silver grain and a golden grain, each "holding one of the princesses", and advises him to go further, lift a rock and tame the black horse of the twelve-headed deva. Tanom takes the horse, goes back to the rope and fills the cauldron with the devas' treasure. Tanom's brothers betray him and cut off the rope, trapping him in the underworld. Still there, Tanom fights againt the twelve-headed deva, swallows the grains and returns to the surface. He exposes his brothers' deceit and marries the khan's youngest daughter.

See also
 Prâslea the Brave and the Golden Apples (Romanian fairy tale)
 The Gnome (German fairy tale)
 The Story of Bensurdatu (Italian fairy tale)
 Fehérlófia (Hungarian folk tale)

Explanatory notes

References

External links
 Зорька, Вечорка и Полуночка on Wikisource (in Russian)

Russian fairy tales
European folklore
Siblings in fiction
ATU 300-399
Jeremiah Curtin